Standon Bridge railway station was a railway station in Standon, approximately  west of Stone, Staffordshire. The station closed on 4 February 1952, the same day as Whitmore railway station 4 miles further north.

The station is close to Mill Meece Pumping Station, an early 20th-century preserved steam-powered water pumping station built by Staffordshire Potteries Waterworks Company. During installation of a second steam engine in 1926–27, parts were delivered to Standon Bridge railway station and transferred by horse and cart to the pumping station.

The station is also near to Swynnerton Army training camp, a large former Royal Ordnance Factory.

References

Further reading

Disused railway stations in Staffordshire
Railway stations in Great Britain opened in 1837
Railway stations in Great Britain closed in 1952
Former London and North Western Railway stations